The 10th Lambda Literary Awards were held in 1998 to honour works of LGBT literature published in 1997.

Special awards

Nominees and winners

External links
 10th Lambda Literary Awards

Lambda Literary Awards
Lambda
Lists of LGBT-related award winners and nominees
Lambda Literary Awards
Lambda Literary Awards